The Couture is an under-construction high-rise apartment building in Downtown Milwaukee, Wisconsin. The 507-foot, 44-story high-rise will become the state of Wisconsin's tallest residential building when completed in 2023, and will feature 312 high-end apartments, 50,000 square feet of restaurant and retail space, and an 1,100-space parking structure with hundreds of public parking spaces.

History
First proposed in 2012, the project has undergone several programming and design revisions. The tower was originally expected to include a 180-room hotel, but that proposal was removed in 2014 with the construction of the neighboring Westin Hotel. The proposed 179 apartment units was increased to 294 apartments and later expanded to 322 apartments. In 2014, the developer and the city of Milwaukee revised the design to include an enclosed stop of The Hop. In 2015, the project went through litigation regarding the sale and demolition of the Milwaukee County Transit Center to the developer, Barrett Lo Visionary Development. In June, 2015 a Circuit Court judge ruled in favor of Milwaukee County and the developer allowing the sale to proceed. On June 26, 2020, the developer, Barrett Lo Visionary Development, announced equity funding had been secured earlier in the month and they had resubmitted the project for HUD funding.

Design and Construction
A groundbreaking event was held on June 16, 2021 with speeches by former Milwaukee Mayor Tom Barrett and Milwaukee County Executive David Crowley. RINKA is serving as the lead architect on the project with J.H. Findorff as the General Contractor. The tower went vertical in Summer 2022 after several months of site prep and underground work. In February, 2022, the developer announced an intention to complete the project by the end of 2023. When completed, the Couture will be the 4th tallest building in the city of Milwaukee and the tallest residential building in the state of Wisconsin.

References

External links 
 The Couture

Proposed skyscrapers in the United States
Buildings and structures in Milwaukee